The Walter Mars was a Czechoslovakian 14-cylinder, air-cooled radial engine for powering aircraft, a licensed built Gnome-Rhône 14M.

Applications
Focke-Wulf Fw 189Note. 204 of these airplanes were produced in the Aero Praha factory during the war.

Engines on display
A preserved example of the Walter Mars engine is on display at the following museum:
Prague Aviation Museum, Kbely

Specifications (Mars)

See also

References

1930s aircraft piston engines
Mars
Aircraft air-cooled radial piston engines